The Kumbaya Festival was an annual Canadian music and arts festival in the 1990s. It was organized by Molly Johnson as a benefit for Canadian charities and groups doing work around HIV and AIDS.

The festival was broadcast live on MuchMusic each year, with the broadcast including a toll-free number which home viewers could call to make additional donations. Compilation CDs of performances from the festival were also subsequently released to raise additional funds. The festival raised over $1 million during its years of activity.

Each annual festival consisted primarily of musical performers, although each also featured numerous writers reading literary pieces, as well as actors, media personalities, HIV/AIDS activists and other Canadian public figures speaking on the importance of the HIV/AIDS issue.

Although the Kumbaya Foundation, the organization which staged the festival, is still active in Canadian and international HIV/AIDS fundraising as of 2014, the festival itself has not been staged since 1996. Johnson has, however, expressed an interest in reviving the festival.

Performers and speakers
The lists of participants can be found at the Kumbaya Foundation website.

1993

1994

1995

1996

References

External links
 

Music festivals in Toronto
1993 establishments in Ontario
HIV/AIDS in Canada
Music festivals established in 1993
LGBT-related television specials